Csaba László (born 4 October 1962) is a Hungarian politician, who served as Minister of Finance between 2002 and 2004. During his ministership the state budget deficiency rose and the macroeconomic indicators were spoiling because of the so-called "hundred-day program". He was succeeded by Tibor Draskovics.

References
 Biography

1962 births
Living people
Finance ministers of Hungary